Fabiana de Barros (born November 27, 1957 in São Paulo) is a Swiss artist of Brazilian origin. She is the daughter of a well-known Brazilian photographer and contemporary artist, Geraldo de Barros, and is also the sister of the artist Lenora de Barros. She works and lives in Geneva and São Paulo.

Biography

Early life 
While studying at the Faculdade de Artes Plasticas of São Paulo, Fabiana de Barros also studied with the painter Antonio Carelli. In 1985, she obtained a grant for a study trip abroad in Geneva. She met the artist Carmen Perrin, with whom she continued to work with in her postgraduate studies at the École supérieure des Beaux-Arts in Geneva. She shifted from studying painting to sculpture, and broadened her work to installation art and got involved with the creation of public art.

Work
This artist loves to create contacts, nets of relationships and that her art pieces are the result of multiple dynamics. Very soon, recurrent themes appear in her work: travels, mega-cities, the urban context, the relationships between individuals, and the power of social context.

In 1987, Fabiana de Barros had her first individual exhibition in Geneva. Tours du monde will be then shown at São Paulo Museum of Art. In 1988, she was invited to the 20th Biennale of São Paulo, where she will be a guest many times over the years.

In 1991, Fabiana de Barros met the Swiss photographer, video and film maker Michel Favre, to whom she is married today. He introduced her to photography, video and the World Wide Web. Their collaboration is very intense in all fields.

In 1994, during the Biennale of São Paulo, they launched Migraçoes, a transatlantic art happening where 17 Swiss artists are invited to São Paulo to create in situ in three different museums: the São Paulo Museum of Image and Sound, the São Paulo Museum of Art and the Museum of Contemporary Art, University of São Paulo.

For the exhibition Migraçoes, Fabiana de Barros and Michel Favre worked together for the first time as artists. They launched Aller-Retour, a travel agency situated in a confined space where Fabiana meets people, proposing an imaginary trip based on drawings and paintings. Aller-Retour grew over the years to become a video installation and a series of photos.

AUTO PSi is another urban intervention piece imagined by Michel Favre and Fabiana de Barros. The Brazilian artist proposes to trade a free taxi trip against stories the passenger imagines when he is shown drawings. The first version of this piece was completed in São Paulo, with the collaboration of the SESC, and then in Geneva. In São Paulo, the AUTO PSi experience is the starting point of the film L’Image à Paroles directed by Michel Favre.

In 1996, Fabiana de Barros made yet another very important encounter. She met Adelina von Fürstenberg, exhibition commissaire and founder of the NGO Art for the World. She contributed to the artist's interests for participative and contextual art. The two women joined their forces for numerous projects and expositions around the world. Since 2000, a model of the Fiteiro Cultural travels with the exhibition "PLAYGROUND & TOYS - for  refugee children" through the world. In 2003, one Fiteiro Cultural was built in a schoolyard in Yerevan, Armenia.

During a Pro Helvetia residence in João Pessoa in 1998, Fabiana de Barros created the concept of Fiteiro Cultural. The piece takes for model small shop barracks from the Nordeste of Brazil, built from a few wooden planks, the improvised shops sell anything you need. This little cultural shop is a space closed by planks, with numerous openings and thought of as an informal cultural exchange platform and a performance scene, not only for the artists, but for the public as well. Since then, Culture Kiosks were put up in Athens, Sion, New York City, Havana, Yerevan, Lisbon, São Paulo, Dunkirk, Milan and Geneva. The artists’ most egocentric dream would be that in 20 years, one speaks of the Culture Kiosk like of a table, a chair, or just some usual everyday object.

OPEN, published in 2005 with Antonio Zaya, and with the help of the SESC of São Paulo, takes a look back on seven years of Culture Kiosk. It assembles the thoughts and theories of the different artistic partners in different cities: Danilo Santos de Miranda, director of the SESC of São Paulo, the curator Carlos Basualdo, the anthropologist Jeremy Narby and Marie-Claude Morand, director of the Musées cantonaux du Valais.

The Culture Kiosk exists also in the virtual world Second Life, where one can also see performances by invited artists and new art pieces.

Curatorial
Fabiana de Barros did not forget the history that led to her rich artistic life. Since 1989, she very actively runs the photographic legacy of Geraldo de Barros. She organised important shows at the Museum Ludwig in Cologne, Germany (1999), The Élysée Museum in Lausanne, Switzerland (2000) and The MoMA in New-York  (2007). She also took good care of the edition of the books SOBRAS and FOTOFORMAS, that reproduce most of the photographic work of Geraldo de Barros. She also produced a long-feature film about his work, directed by Michel Favre: Sobras em Obras presented at the 30th Mostra of São Paulo, at Beyrouth's Docuday and at the festival Visions du Réel in Nyon, Switzerland. The movie was primed twice: once in Rio de Janeiro in 2000 and once in Solznok, Hungary.

Publications
 1º architecture, art and landscape biennal of the Canaries.
 [OPEN] Fiteiro Culturalpublication dedicated to the Culture Kiosk. Editor Antonio Zaya. With texts by Danilo Santos de Miranda, Fabiana de Barros, Carmen Perrin, Murilo Campelo, Maria Papadimitriou, Anne-Laure Oberson, Marie Claude Morand, Mireille M-Wagnieres, Pascal Rebetez, Antonio Zaya, Adelina von Fürstenberg, Jeremy Narby, Raimo Benedetti, Estudio Colectivo, Espaço Coringa et Carlos Basualdo
 Going public '05 aMAZE cultural lab 
 Elle m'a dit kiosque a culture ajs AJS Dunkerque, DRAC Nord Pas de Calais France et LAAC - Lieu d’Art et Action Contemporaine de Dunkerque, France
 Mira como se mueven/See how they move Fundación Telefónica, Madrid
 Latinidades exhibition SESC Ipiranga, São Paulo
 Novidades revistas Temporada de Projetos Petrobrás, Paço das Artes, São Paulo
 Art for the world 1996-2002 Geneva
 24° Bienal internacional de São Paulo
 T.A.M.A. (Temporary Autonomous Museum for All) by Maria Papadimitriou, Athena
 The edge of awareness  Art for The World
 Laboratoire Pro Helvetia
 Confrontations Musée Historique de Nyon
 Migraçoes - 17 artistes suisses à São Paulo
 Art museum project São Paulo
 20° Bienal internacional de São Paulo
 Tours du monde Museu de Arte de São Paulo - MASP
 Pintura contemporanea de São Paulo mab Proposta para os años 80 Pinacoteca do Estado de São Paulo
 Arte na rua MAC'' São Paulo

References

1957 births
Swiss contemporary artists
Living people
Brazilian emigrants to Switzerland
Swiss women artists
People from São Paulo
Artists from Geneva
20th-century Swiss artists
21st-century Swiss artists